Dinnington is an English place name. It may refer to the following places in England:

 Dinnington, Somerset
 Dinnington, South Yorkshire
 Dinnington, Tyne and Wear